UDA Holdings Berhad (formerly Urban Development Authority of Malaysia) is a Malaysian holding company. It served to launch and oversee urban development projects related to business, industry, and housing. It was also tasked with developing urban infrastructure. After undergoing a couple of status changes, it now exists as UDA Holdings Berhad, a publicly listed company.

History
Urban Development Authority of Malaysia (UDA) was established on 12 November 1971 under the Ministry of Public Enterprise. In 1996, it was incorporated and changed its full name to UDA Holdings Sendirian Berhad (UDA Holdings Private Limited). Later in 1999, it changed its status to a public limited company and changed its name to UDA Holdings Berhad. It was subsequently publicly listed on the Main Board of the Kuala Lumpur Stock Exchange (KLSE).

Real estate and property

Development
UDA develops and reappropriates urban structures as it sees fit. Although this is mainly confined to redeveloping "dilapidated buildings", UDA is also responsible for conservation of historic urban buildings. Several new towns have been developed by UDA, including the Bandar Tun Hussein Onn in Cheras; Bandar UDA Utama in Pulai; Bandar Pauh Jaya in Permatang Pauh; Tanjung Tokong in Penang; Bandar Baru UDA in Johor Bahru; Pusat Bandar Tampoi in Johor Bahru; and Skudai Kanan in Johor Bahru. The development projects of UDA are implemented by its subsidiaries, PNS Development, UDA-Murni Development, UDAPEC, SBBU, and PERUDA Development.

A joint venture development between UDA, EPF and EcoWorld was announced in 2016 to develop the Bukit Bintang City Centre (BBCC), a fully integrated development located at the former site of Pudu Jail, with the project 40% owned by UDA, 40% owned by Eco World Development Group Berhad and 20% owned by EPF.

Maintenance
Properties belonging to or managed by UDA are maintained by its subsidiary companies. These properties include shopping complexes and apartment buildings. UBSB is the subsidiary that handles rental collection, carpark management, building maintenance, security, and other assorted services. City Guards is the subsidiary handling most of the security work, with 212 security personnel and 10 branches guarding 22 premises in the states of Selangor, Terengganu, Perak, Johor and Negri Sembilan, as well as the Federal Territory of Kuala Lumpur. Other subsidiaries dealing with maintenance are Daya Urus and Pertama Buildings Management.

Tourism and retailing
UDA has recently expanded into the hospitality industry, operating a hotel and three resorts in Kuala Lumpur, Port Dickson, Kuala Terengganu, and Seberang Prai. These lodgings are run by subsidiaries of UDA as well.

UDA has established a chain of retail outlets through a joint venture subsidiary, UDA Ocean. UDA has also ventured into franchising, and has a fashion line named "Bonia".

Business performance
As of February 2006, the most recent full fiscal year for which statistics are available is 2004. In 2004, after-tax profit for UDA was RM17,665,000. Basic earnings per share was 5.61 sen, and shareholders' funds totaled RM1,159,454,000.

Notes and references

External links
 UDA Holdings Bhd Official website
 UDA Holdings Berhad (MYX: 5013), bursamalaysia.com
 Company Overview of UDA Holdings Berhad, bloomberg.com

1999 establishments in Malaysia
Economy of Malaysia
Urban development
Urban planning in Malaysia
Housing in Malaysia
Holding companies established in 1999
Malaysian companies established in 1999
Companies formerly listed on Bursa Malaysia
Government-owned companies of Malaysia
Minister of Finance (Incorporated) (Malaysia)
Privately held companies of Malaysia